Smeds is a surname. Notable people with the surname include:

Boris Smeds (born 1944), Swedish radio engineer
Dave Smeds (born 1955), American writer
Kristian Smeds (born 1970), Finnish playwright and theatre director
Viktor Smeds (1885–1957), Finnish gymnast